Nouzerines is a commune in the Creuse department in the Nouvelle-Aquitaine region in central France.

Geography

Population

Sights
 The eleventh-century church of St.Clair.
 A restored washhouse.
 The Lac de Cluzeau.

Notable residents

 Chris Richardson, Musician
 Jean-Luc Mauger, Peintre

See also
Communes of the Creuse department

References

Communes of Creuse